Nathan Barrett may refer to:

 Nathan Barrett (ice hockey) (born 1981), Canadian ice hockey centre
 Nathan Barrett (politician) (born 1976), Australian politician
 Nathan Franklin Barrett (1845–1919), American landscape architect